Massachusetts House of Representatives' 8th Essex district in the United States is one of 160 legislative districts included in the lower house of the Massachusetts General Court. It covers part of Essex County. Democrat Jenny Armini, of Marblehead has represented the district since 2023.

Towns represented
The district includes the following localities:
 part of Lynn
 Marblehead
 Swampscott

The current district geographic boundary overlaps with that of the Massachusetts Senate's 3rd Essex district.

Former locales
The district previously covered:
 Essex, circa 1872 
 Gloucester, circa 1872

Representatives
 James H. Duncan, circa 1858 
 Nathan S. Kimball, circa 1858-1859 
 James Russell, circa 1859 
 Luther Dame, circa 1888 
 Edward P. Shaw, circa 1888 
 James P. Donnelly, circa 1920 
 Michael J. Batal, circa 1951 
 Henry J. O'Donnell III, circa 1975 
 Lawrence Alexander, 1979-1991 
 Douglas W. Petersen
 Lori Ehrlich, 2009-2023
 Jenny Armini, 2023-present

See also
 List of Massachusetts House of Representatives elections
 Other Essex County districts of the Massachusetts House of Representatives: 1st, 2nd, 3rd, 4th, 5th, 6th, 7th, 9th, 10th, 11th, 12th, 13th, 14th, 15th, 16th, 17th, 18th
 Essex County districts of the Massachusett Senate: 1st, 2nd, 3rd; 1st Essex and Middlesex; 2nd Essex and Middlesex
 List of Massachusetts General Courts
 List of former districts of the Massachusetts House of Representatives

Images

References

External links
 Ballotpedia
  (State House district information based on U.S. Census Bureau's American Community Survey).
 League of Women Voters of Marblehead

House
Government of Essex County, Massachusetts